Myoxocephalus sinensis is a species of sculpin fish in the family Cottidae.  The species is native to China and is indicated variously either as a freshwater or as a marine fish.

References

sinensis
Fish described in 1873
Fish of China